Sompong Amornvivat (born 3 July 1941) is a Thai politician for the Pheu Thai Party.

Early life and education
Sompong Amornvivat was born on 3 July 1941. He is the younger brother of Police General Sawat Amornvivat, a former Chief of Police. He graduated from primary and secondary education at Amnuay Silpa School and holds a Bachelor of Business Administration from Curry College in the United States and holds a master's degree in political science (politics and government) from Chiang Mai University.

Political careers
On 2 December 2008, the Constitutional Court of Thailand passed a resolution to dissolve the People's Power Party and cut the political rights of the party executive committee for 5 years each. Therefore, as he was Deputy Prime Minister and the Minister of Foreign Affairs at the time, and the Deputy Leader of the People Power Party, he had to vacate the position and was disqualified for 5 years. During his disqualification period, he attended the senior executive course of the Capital Market Academy of the Stock Exchange of Thailand, in the 11th edition.

In the past, Sompong was the leader of the Group 16, with important members of the Group 16, namely Suchat Tancharoen, Newin Chidchob, Sora-at Klinpratoom  under Thai Rak Thai together. After the Thai Rak Thai Party was dissolved, Sompong took over the chairmanship of the Thai Rak Thai Group.

In the 2014 general election of the Thai House of Representatives, he was elected in the roster for Pheu Thai Party, but the election was invalidated. In 2018, He moved to join the Pheu Thai Party and was elected to the position of party leader until in November he resigned from being a member. In the 2019 general election of the Thai House of Representatives he ran in the 5th constituency for Chiang Mai Province in the name of the Pheu Thai Party and was elected.

In 2018, he was nominated as the President of the House of Representatives, and finished in second place behind Chuan Leekpai MP of the Democrat Party, 258 votes to 235, with one abstention. As the leader of Pheu Thai, the largest opposition party in the legislature, Sompong has been the leader of the opposition in the House of Representatives since 2019.

On 28 October 2021, At the Pheu Thai Party Annual General Meeting of 2021 Sompong resigned as Pheu Thai Party leader to provide opportunities for new generations to continue their duties, he will turn to support the strategy and direction of the party.

Personal life
Sompong married with Pecharee Amornvivat, having children as follows Roselyn Amornvivat, Pongpun Amornvivat, Goil Amornvivat and Julapun Amornvivat.

Royal decorations 
Sompong has received the following royal decorations in the Honours System of Thailand:
  Knight Grand Cordon (Special Class) of The Most Noble Order of the Crown of Thailand
  Knight Grand Cordon (Special Class) of the Most Exalted Order of the White Elephant

References

Living people
Sompong Amornwiwat
1941 births
Sompong Amornwiwat
Sompong Amornwiwat
Sompong Amornwiwat
Sompong Amornwiwat
Sompong Amornwiwat
Sompong Amornwiwat
Sompong Amornwiwat
Sompong Amornwiwat
Sompong Amornwiwat
Sompong Amornwiwat